Discolobium is a genus of flowering plants in the legume family, Fabaceae. It belongs to the subfamily Faboideae, and was recently assigned to the informal monophyletic Pterocarpus clade of the Dalbergieae.

References

Dalbergieae
Fabaceae genera